Jahmar Thorpe (born September 2, 1984) is an American professional basketball player for the Kanazawa Samuraiz in Japan.

Born in Morristown, New Jersey, Thorpe played basketball at Morristown High School.

Thorpe joined Kawasaki Brave Thunders in 2020 and averaged 1.7 points, 2.5 rebounds and 1.0 assist per game. He signed with the Saga Ballooners on September 29, 2020. In 2021, he played for Alvark Tokyo and averaged 4.9 points and 3.0 rebounds per game. On September 6, 2021, Thorpe signed with the Kanazawa Samuraiz.

References

1984 births
Living people
Altiri Chiba players
Alvark Tokyo players
American expatriate basketball people in China
American expatriate basketball people in Denmark
American expatriate basketball people in Finland
American expatriate basketball people in France
American expatriate basketball people in Germany
American expatriate basketball people in Japan
American expatriate basketball people in Luxembourg
American expatriate basketball people in Vietnam
American men's basketball players
Austin Toros players
Bakken Bears players
Bambitious Nara players
Basketball players from New Jersey
BG Göttingen players
Houston Cougars men's basketball players
Iwate Big Bulls players
Junior college men's basketball players in the United States
Kawasaki Brave Thunders players
Koshigaya Alphas players
Kumamoto Volters players
Levanga Hokkaido players
Utsunomiya Brex players
Morristown High School (Morristown, New Jersey) alumni
Osaka Evessa players
People from Morristown, New Jersey
Power forwards (basketball)
Rizing Zephyr Fukuoka players
Saga Ballooners players
Saigon Heat players
Sendai 89ers players
Sportspeople from Morris County, New Jersey
Sun Rockers Shibuya players
Tokyo Hachioji Bee Trains players